The 1925 South Dakota Coyotes football team was an American football team that represented the University of South Dakota in the North Central Conference (NCC) during the 1925 college football season. In its fourth season under head coach Stub Allison, the team compiled a 3–5 record (1–4 against NCC opponents) and outscored opponents by a total of 93 to 39. The team played its home games at Inman Field in Vermillion, South Dakota.

South Dakota tackle Malone was selected as a first-team player on the 1925 All-North Central Conference football team.

Schedule

References

South Dakota
South Dakota Coyotes football seasons
South Dakota Coyotes football